Ghasipura is a Vidhan Sabha constituency of Kendujhar district.
Area of this constituency include Ghatgaon, Ghatagaon block, Ghasipura block and 2 GPs (Dhakotha and Kolimati) of Anandapur block.

Elected Members

This constituency was created in 2009. Three election held here from2009 to 2019. Elected member from Ghasipura Vidhan Sabha constituency is:
2019: Badrinarayan Patra (BJD)
2014: Badrinarayan Patra (BJD)
2009: Badrinarayan Patra (BJD)

Election Results

2019
In 2019 election Biju Janata Dal candidate Badri Narayan Patra, defeated Indian National Congress candidate Niranjan Patnaik by a margin of 32,668 votes.

2014
In 2009 election Biju Janata Dal candidate Badri Narayan Patra, defeated Bharatiya Janata Party candidate Satyabrata Panda by a margin of 88,602 votes.

2009
In 2009 election Biju Janata Dal candidate Badri Narayan Patra, defeated Indian National Congress candidate Niranjan Patnaik by a margin of 25,554 votes.

Notes

References

Kendujhar district
Assembly constituencies of Odisha